Herold Leonhart Driedger (born March 28, 1942 in Winnipeg, Manitoba) is a politician in the Canadian province of Manitoba.  He was a member of the Legislative Assembly of Manitoba from 1988 to 1990, representing the Winnipeg riding of Niakwa for the Manitoba Liberal Party.

Driedger worked as a teacher before entering public life.  He first sought election to the Manitoba legislature in the 1986 provincial election, running for Sidney Green's Progressive Party in the riding of Radisson.  He received only 240 votes, as against 4810 for the winning candidate, New Democrat Gerard Lecuyer.

In the 1988 provincial election, he ran as a Liberal in Niakwa and defeated incumbent Progressive Conservative Abe Kovnats by 1354 votes.  The Liberals increased their parliamentary representation from one to twenty in this election, and Driedger sat in the official opposition benches for the next two years.  In the 1990 election, he was defeated by Progressive Conservative candidate Louise Dacquay in the redistributed riding of Seine River by 47 votes, amid a general loss of support for the Liberal Party.  He has not sought a return to political life since then.

In 1989-90, Driedger served as the first vice-president of the Canadian Council of Public Accountants (the president was Loyola Hearn, who was later a Conservative MP in the House of Commons of Canada).  He is also a member of the Canadian Prostate Cancer Network.

Election results

References

1942 births
Canadian people of German descent
Living people
Manitoba Liberal Party MLAs
Politicians from Winnipeg